The Memorial to Victims of the Injustice of the Holocaust in New York City is a sculpture by Harriet Feigenbaum, on the side of the Appellate Division Courthouse of New York State, at Madison Avenue and 25th Street in Manhattan, United States.

Background

Back Story
Judge Francis T. Murphy, presiding justice of the New York State Court of Appeals, conceived the idea of creating a Holocaust memorial monument at the site.  Ms. Feigenbaum won the 1988 competition to design the memorial, with a proposal to feature a replica of an aerial photograph of the Auschwitz concentration camp taken by American planes as they bombed German oil factories nearby on August 25, 1944.

The photos are significant because of the Auschwitz bombing debate as they demonstrate that U.S. planes had the ability to bomb the death camp.  Some of the factories that the planes were bombing were less than five miles from the gas chambers.  Additional such raids took place in September 1944, December 1944, and January 1945.  George S. McGovern, the future U.S. Senator and Democratic presidential nominee, was a pilot on one of the raids.

Sculptor
Ms. Feigenbaum, who attended Columbia University and the National Academy School of Fine Arts, has exhibited widely.  She is known in particular for her environmentally conscious works, including a major project related to the damage caused by strip-mining in Pennsylvania.

The Sculpture
The sculpture is titled Memorial to Victims of the Injustice of the Holocaust. The New York City Department of Cultural Affairs describes it as "a six-sided half column rising 27 feet above its base. The five-sided concave base extends one story below ground level, the overall height of the Memorial being 38 feet. Carvings of flames along the length of the column recall the flames of the gas chambers at Auschwitz. They appear to blow in the direction of the courthouse as if to threaten the symbol of Justice. A relief of an aerial view of the main camp at Auschwitz is carved into the base at eye level...On the base under the relief is a giant flame extending below ground level as a final reminder of Crematorium 1 at Auschwitz."  The words "Indifference to Injustice is the Gate to Hell" are engraved around the image.

Feigenbaum's carving noted five of the specific points within the Auschwitz camp that were visible in the original photograph:  Torture Chamber, Execution Wall, Gas Chamber and Crematorium 1, Commandant's House.

References

1990 sculptures
Holocaust commemoration
Marble sculptures in New York City
Outdoor sculptures in Manhattan